Patricia Chanco Evangelista is a Filipina journalist and documentary filmmaker based in Manila, whose coverage focuses mostly on conflict, disaster and human rights. She is a multimedia reporter for online news agency Rappler and is a writer-at-large for Esquire magazine.

Education
Evangelista finished high school at Saint Theresa's College of Quezon City. She graduated cum laude with a degree of BA Speech Communication University of the Philippines Diliman in 2006. She is an alumna of the UP Debate Society (UPDEBSOC).

Career
At 18, Evangelista first came to national attention when she became the first Filipino to win the London-based annual International Public Speaking Championships - an annual competition sponsored by the English-Speaking Union held in London. Her speech entitled Blonde and Blue Eyes for the theme Borderless World, bested 59 contestants from 37 countries.

Early career 
She was first published as a youth columnist by The Philippine Star, and then went on to write a weekly column for the Philippine Daily Inquirer'''s opinion section that ran for nine years. She has written for Rogue magazine and UNO.

Evangelista had her start in television journalism as a production assistant for ABS-CBN News Channel (ANC). She went on to produce a number of programs and documentaries, including the groundbreaking narrative series, Storyline that ran over the ABS-CBN News Channel for five years. She also wrote and produced  the short film series AmBisyon and Kinse. She was the executive producer behind ANC's Truths, a three-part investigative documentary on abortion, disaster, and human rights.
 
She is a fellow of the South East Asian Press Alliance (SEAPA), is a Titus Brandsma Awardee for Emergent Journalism and was part of Devex's 2012 40 under 40.

She is the co-founder of Storyline Productions with filmmaker Paolo Villaluna. Her various television projects have been recipients of a number of local awards including the Gawad Tanglaw, the Catholic Mass Media Award, as well as three New York Festivals medals.

Evangelista's short film on the aftermath of Supertyphoon Haiyan won the media prize at the Ministerial Conference for Disaster Risk Reduction in Thailand in 2014. She was also awarded the 2014 Kate Webb Prize for frontline journalism.

She is a field reporter for Rappler, producing documentary and news pieces as well as analysis for the Thought Leaders section. As a writer-at-large for Esquire'' magazine since its inception, Evangelista writes long-form journalism pieces and profiles politicians and newsmakers.

See also 
 Nicole Curato
 Paolo Villaluna

References

Filipino documentary filmmakers
Filipino online journalists
Living people
University of the Philippines Diliman alumni
Filipino journalists
Year of birth missing (living people)